Bill Clinton presidential campaign may refer to:

 Bill Clinton presidential campaign, 1992
 Bill Clinton presidential campaign, 1996